Alexander Berner (born 1901, date of death unknown) was a Swiss skeleton racer who competed in the late 1920s. He finished fifth in the men's skeleton event at the 1928 Winter Olympics in St. Moritz.

References
1928 men's skeleton results
Wallechinsky, David (1984). "Skeleton (Cresta Run)". The Complete Book of the Olympics: 1896-1980. New York: Penguin Books. p. 576.
Alexander Berner's profile at Sports Reference.com

1901 births
Skeleton racers at the 1928 Winter Olympics
Swiss male skeleton racers
Year of death missing
Olympic skeleton racers of Switzerland